Daniel Silva (born 1960) is an American journalist and author of thriller and spy novels.

Early life 
Silva was born in Kalamazoo, Michigan. When Silva was seven years old, his family moved to Merced, California. He was raised as a Catholic.

He received his Bachelor of Arts degree from California State University, Fresno and began a graduate program in international relations at San Francisco State University, but left when offered employment as a journalist at United Press International (UPI).

Career

Journalist
Silva began his writing career as a journalist with a temporary position at UPI in 1984. His assignment was to cover the Democratic National Convention. UPI made Silva's position permanent and, a year later transferred him to the Washington, D.C. headquarters. After two more years, he was appointed as UPI's Middle East correspondent and moved to Cairo.

Silva returned to Washington, D.C., for a position with Cable News Network's Washington bureau. He worked as a producer and executive producer for several of CNN's television programs, including Crossfire and Capital Gang.

Novelist
In 1994 he began work on his first novel, The Unlikely Spy (1996). The novel debuted on The New York Times best-seller list on January 26, 1997; it remained on the list for five weeks, rising to number 13. In 1997 Silva left CNN to pursue writing full-time.

Since then Silva has written 23 more spy novels, all best-sellers on The New York Times list. Gabriel Allon, an Israeli art restorer, spy and assassin, is the protagonist in all but three of Silva's titles. The series has been a New York Times bestseller since its first installment in 2001. Thirteen of the series' titles hit number one on The New York Times list of best sellers (Bibliography, below). Some of his novels involve Islamic terrorism, some involve Russian villains, and some are about historic events related to World War II and the Holocaust. Silva did not come into the Allon series with a significant understanding of the world of art restoration but was able to use a neighbor's expertise to help him turn a spy-assassin into an artist.

Adaptations
In 2007, Universal Pictures made an offer to option the rights to Silva's Gabriel Allon series, starting with The Messenger (2005). In 2011, it was announced that Jeff Zucker would serve as producer, though the deal was never signed. On May 15, 2017, MGM Television acquired the adaption rights for the Allon series, though no production schedule was released and it was not specified which novel or novels were under consideration.

Personal life
Silva met Jamie Gangel, a CNN special correspondent while they were both correspondents in the Middle East. They later married, and Silva converted from Catholicism to Judaism, his wife's religion.

Silva and his wife have twin children. Silva frequently takes his children on research trips for his books.

Honors
2007 Barry Award for Best Thriller for The Messenger, 2013 Barry Award for Best Thriller for The Fallen Angel.
In January 2009, Silva was appointed to the United States Holocaust Memorial Museum's United States Holocaust Memorial Council.

Bibliography

Weeks on The New York Times best seller list
Highest level on The New York Times best seller list

References

External links

Author's biography

1960 births
Living people
Converts to Judaism from Roman Catholicism
Jewish American writers
American people of Portuguese descent
American spy fiction writers
Barry Award winners
American male novelists
21st-century American Jews